This is a list of the members of the 3rd Seanad Éireann,  the upper house of the Oireachtas (legislature) of Ireland.  These Senators were elected or appointed in 1938, after the 1938 general election and served until the close of poll for the 4th Seanad in 1943.

Composition of the 3rd Seanad
There are a total of 60 seats in the Seanad. 43 Senators are elected by the Vocational panels, 6 elected by the Universities and 11 are nominated by the Taoiseach.

The following table shows the composition by party when the 3rd Seanad first met on 7 September 1938.

List of senators

Changes

See also
Members of the 10th Dáil
Government of the 10th Dáil

References

External links

 
03